The International Mine Water Association (IMWA) is the first scientific-technical association worldwide dedicated to mine water related topics. Its peer-reviewed journal is Mine Water and the Environment.

History 

IMWA was founded in 1979 in Granada, Spain, due to the steadily increasing problems related to water in the mining sector. Back then, the main focus of the association was on safety issues of water in mining. Over the years the focal point changed to more environmental issues. Since its conception, IMWA aimed to promote contacts between researchers, mine operators, consultants, and students. For this purpose, IMWA organizes congresses every three years and, in the years in between, symposia are held. In 2014, about 250 delegates from 40 nations attended the 12th IMWA Congress in Xuzhou (徐州), China.

Publications 

Since 1982, the IMWA has published the Journal of the International Mine Water Association which was later (1994) renamed Mine Water and the Environment. Today, the Journal is available electronically (ISSN 1616-1068) and in printed form (ISSN 1025-9112) from Springer-Nature, (Heidelberg, Germany). Since 2010, it is listed in the Science Citation Index Expanded and is dispatched quarterly (March, June, September and December) to more than 1,000 subscribers worldwide. Its electronic articles are requested several thousands of times per month.

Furthermore, the book series Mining and the Environment was launched in 2008 (Springer) with the first volume being devoted to mine water management and tracer tests and the second volume focusing on acidic pit lakes.

Congresses and symposia 

Since its formation, IMWA has held 14 congresses and a number of symposia, all of which were organized by the respective local IMWA host:

 Budapest, Hungary 1982 (1st Congress)
 Granada, Spain 1985 (2nd Congress)
 Nottingham, UK 1986
 Katowice, Poland 1987
 Melbourne, Australia 1988 (3rd Congress)
 Lisbon, Portugal 1990
 Ljubljana•Pörtschach, Slovenia•Austria 1991 (4th Congress)
 Chililabombwe, Zambia 1993
 Nottingham, UK 1994 (5th Congress)
 Denver, USA 1995
 Portorož, Slovenia 1996
 Bled, Slovenia 1997 (6th Congress)
 Johannesburg, South Africa 1998
 Seville, Spain 1999
 Kattowice, Poland 2000 (7th Congress)
 Belo Horizonte, Brazil 2001
 Freiberg, Germany 2002
 Johannesburg, South Africa 2003 (8th Congress)
 Newcastle, UK 2004
 Oviedo, Spain 2005 (9th Congress)
 St. Louis, USA 2006
 Cagliari, Italy 2007
 Carlsbad, Czech Republic 2008 (10th Congress)
 Pretoria, South Africa 2009
 Cape Breton, Canada 2010
 Aachen, Germany 2011 (11th Congress)
 Bunbury, Western Australia 2012
 Golden, Colorado, USA 2013
 Xuzhou, China 2014 (12th Congress)
 Santiago, Chile 2015
 Leipzig, Germany 2016
Rauha/Lappeenranta, Finland 2017 (13th Congress)
Johannesburg, South Africa 2018 
Perm, Russia 2019
2020 (postponed due to coronavirus)
 Cardiff, Wales 2021 (online due to coronavirus) (14th Congress)
 Christchurch, New Zealand 2022

The next meeting is scheduled for:

 Cardiff, Wales 2023

Members 

In 2013 the International Mine Water Association records 851 individual including 66 corporate members from 40 Nations with two local groups in Europe (PADRE) and North America, respectively. Since 1997 membership of the association grew steadily from 70 members to today's numbers; mainly based on the increasing importance of water and its environmental aspects in mining. Most members of IMWA are registered in North America, followed by Europe, South Africa and Australia.

References

External links 
 IMWA - International Mine Water Association

Mining and the environment